This is a list of episodes for the British television drama series Primeval. It premiered on ITV on 10 February 2007 and ran for five series and 36 episodes in total. It was cancelled in June 2009 after the third series, with the network stating it was struggling to fund any more original programming. On 29 September 2009, the station announced it had formed a deal with the digital channels Watch, BBC America, and German broadcaster Pro7, to recommission the programme for the fourth and fifth series. Series 5 of six episodes began on 24 May 2011 on digital channel Watch and was repeated on ITV from 16 June 2012.

Series overview 
The first series revolves around "the team" forming, following several creature attacks in the Forest of Dean, as well as Nick Cutter's search for Helen Cutter, his missing wife, who had suddenly reappeared after eight years. Throughout the series, Nick becomes romantically involved with James Lester's PA, Claudia Brown. In the first series' finale Cutter travels through a time anomaly, and upon his return he discovers that Claudia Brown no longer exists, and the timeline has changed. In Series 2, Cutter adjusts to the new timeline while hunting for a traitor in the group. It marks the last appearance of the character Stephen Hart, who dies at the end of the series. In the third series, Cutter is killed, while Jason Flemyng joins the cast as Police Officer Danny Quinn. Ben Mansfield also joins as Captain Becker, the team's armed support, replacing Stephen Hart. The climax has Connor, Abby, and Quinn pursuing Helen through anomalies to prevent her exterminating the human ancestors. They succeed, Helen is killed, but they remain trapped in past eras.

A year later, both in real and series time, Series 4 began (introduced by a webisode prologue) with Lester now reporting to an industrialist, Philip Burton, who has secret plans to use anomalies, and with a new team leader, Matt Anderson. Abby, and Connor return and have to win back their places on the team.

Episodes

Series 1 (2007)

Series 2 (2008)

Series 3 (2009)

Series 4 webisodes (2010) 

ITV released a series of 5 webisodes on 23 December 2010, 2–4 minutes long, written by Sarah Dollard, that provided background to the upcoming series 4.

Series 4 (2011)

Series 5 (2011)

References 

General references that apply to most episodes

External links 
 
 

Episodes
Lists of British science fiction television series episodes